The Australia national youth beach handball team is the national Under 17 team of Australia. It is governed by the Australian Handball Federation and takes part in international beach handball competitions. 

They are the current Oceania Champions and finished tenth in the World Championship.

Results

World Championships

Youth Olympic Games

Oceania Championship

References

 Junior beach handball players aiming for 2018 Youth Olympics. The Daily Telegraph. 30 Jan 2017. Retrieved 8 Jan 2020.
 IHF INFO SPAIN TAKE GOLD AT THE MEN’S U17 BEACH HANDBALL WORLD CHAMPIONSHIP. Handball Specialist News. 17 July 2017. Retrieved 8 January 2020

External links
Official website
IHF profile

Beach handball
National beach handball teams
Beach handball